Cruise Control is a 2014 play by David Williamson.

Plot
Three couples - one Australian, one English, one American - encounter each other on a cruise.

Background
Williamson said he was inspired by a cruise he took with his wife Kristin. When they arrived on board, they discovered that the dining seat allocations were fixed for the cruise. “You either dine with those people for seven nights in a row or you starve,” Williamson says. “You’re thrust into a situation where you have to coexist with people you don’t know, and I thought it was a great dramatic situation, if people find out that they absolutely loathe each other and things go from bad to worse.”

In 2005 Williamson had written an article about a cruise trip he took which had attracted criticism.

References

External links
Review of 2014 Sydney production at Sydney Morning Herald
Review of 2014 Sydney production at Stage Noise
Review of 2014 Sydney production at Aussie Theatre
Review of 2014 Sydney production at Daily Review

Plays by David Williamson
2014 plays